Blue goose or Blue Goose may refer to:

Snow goose, a North American species of goose
Blue-winged goose, an Ethiopian goose
Blue Goose Records
Honorable Order of the Blue Goose, International, a fraternal and charitable organization
A nickname of the 4-6-4 locomotive leading the Chief passenger train of the Atchison, Topeka and Santa Fe Railway
A nickname of the personal Mercedes-Benz 540K of Hermann Goering
Common nickname for North Central Airlines based on their logo painted on the tails of their aircraft. 
Nickname for patrol vehicles of the Michigan State Police